A former urban district in Devon, England. Created in 1894, absorbed into the municipal borough of Exeter in 1900.

See also

St Thomas, Exeter

Urban districts of England
History of Exeter
1894 establishments in England
1900 disestablishments in England